Fayzabad Airport  is located about  northwest of Fayzabad (also spelled Faizabad or Feyzabad), the capital of Badakhshan Province in Afghanistan. It is a domestic airport under the country's Ministry of Transport and Civil Aviation (MoTCA), and serves the population of Badakhshan Province. Security in and around the airport is provided by the Afghan National Security Forces.

Built during the Soviet occupation, Fayzabad Airport is somewhat unusual in the world, notable for the runway being constructed of pierced steel planking (PSP or Marsden Matting) along its full width and length. Construction of a new asphalt runway was completed during the summer of 2012. It runs parallel to the metal runway which has been blocked off by large rocks.

Airlines and destinations

See also
 List of airports in Afghanistan

References

External links
  (USAIDAfghanistan June 18, 2013) 
 Airport record for Faizabad Airport at Landings.com.
 
 
 
 

Airports in Afghanistan
Buildings and structures in Badakhshan Province